George Partridge (February 8, 1740 – July 7, 1828) was an American teacher and politician. He represented Massachusetts as a delegate to the Continental Congress and as a Representative in the U.S. House.

Background
Partridge was born in Duxbury in the Province of Massachusetts Bay, and attended Harvard College, graduating in 1762 and obtaining a master's degree in 1765. He studied theology but never entered the active ministry. Instead, he became a school teacher in Kingston.

Political career
In 1774, Partridge was elected as a delegate to the Massachusetts Provincial Congress, a provisional government formed to replace the Massachusetts General Court which had been suspended by Royal Governor Gen. Thomas Gage.  Of the first meeting of the Provincial Congress, Partridge wrote:

Gen. Gage said he had come over with his troops and proclamations to frighten us rebels into submission! We soon had his mandate, dissolving the General Court ... So we met [in Salem].  And in a short time we began to ask one another, What can we do? The worst must come to the worst! ... Shall we submit to Great Britain? ... Or shall we resist her encroachments to the point of the sword? ... The gulf is passed.  We will have a Congress at Concord.  We will send letters to all the colonies and urge them to send delegates to meet at Philadelphia ... We will go to our homes and wake everyone that sleeps!

Partridge then served with the Massachusetts House of Representatives from 1775 to 1779. In 1779 the legislature named him a delegate to the Continental Congress. He was reappointed continuously until 1785, although he missed the session held in Princeton, New Jersey in 1783. He was a charter member of the American Academy of Arts and Sciences in 1780.

He served from March 4, 1789 until he resigned on August 14, 1790. He was elected a member of the American Antiquarian Society in 1814.

Partridge died at home in Duxbury in 1828 and is buried in the Mayflower Cemetery there.

Partridge Academy
Upon his death, Partridge bequeathed $10,000 to form a private secondary school in Duxbury.  This led to the establishment of Patridge Academy which was built on Tremont Street in Duxbury in 1844.  The Academy served as the town's only secondary school until the construction of the first Duxbury High School in 1927.  Partridge Academy burned in 1933 and its location is now occupied by the Duxbury Town Offices.

References

External links

1740 births
1828 deaths
Continental Congressmen from Massachusetts
18th-century American politicians
Fellows of the American Academy of Arts and Sciences
Members of the American Antiquarian Society
Harvard University alumni
Members of the Massachusetts House of Representatives
Members of the United States House of Representatives from Massachusetts
People from Duxbury, Massachusetts
Schoolteachers from Massachusetts
People of colonial Massachusetts